Milltown–Head of Bay d'Espoir is a town in the Canadian province of Newfoundland and Labrador. The town had a population of 669 in the Canada 2021 Census.

In January 2017, Bay d'Espoir Academy, along with the local RCMP detachment and Milltown Town Hall/Fire Department, was set ablaze in an act of arson. The original school was located in Milltown. A new school was built on a parcel of land in St. Alban's with construction completed in October 2021.

Demographics 

See also
 Bay d'Espoir
 Bay d'Espoir Hydroelectric Power Station
 List of cities and towns in Newfoundland and Labrador

References

Towns in Newfoundland and Labrador